This is a list of law enforcement agencies in the US state of Washington.

According to the US Bureau of Justice Statistics' 2008 Census of State and Local Law Enforcement Agencies, the state had 260 law enforcement agencies employing 11,411 sworn police officers, about 174 for each 100,000 residents. The state has the lowest ratio of police officers to residents of any state, compared to a national average of 251 per 100,000 residents.

State agencies 
Washington State Attorney General's Office
Washington State Department of Corrections
Washington State Department of Fish and Wildlife
Washington State Department of Labor and Industries
Washington State Department of Natural Resources
Washington State Gambling Commission
Washington State Liquor and Cannabis Board
Washington State Parks
Washington State Patrol

County agencies 

 Adams County Sheriff's Office
 Asotin County Sheriff's Office
 Benton County Sheriff's Office
 Chelan County Sheriff's Office
 Clallam County Sheriff's Office
 Clark County Sheriff's Office
 Columbia County Sheriff's Office
 Cowlitz County Sheriff's Office
 Douglas County Sheriff's Office
 Ferry County Sheriff's Office
 Franklin County Sheriff's Office
 Garfield County Sheriff's Office
 Grant County Sheriff's Office
 Grays Harbor County Sheriff's Office
 Island County Sheriff's Office
 Jefferson County Sheriff's Office
 King County Sheriff's Office
 Kitsap County Sheriff's Office
 Kittitas County Sheriff's Office
 Klickitat County Sheriff's Office
 Lewis County Sheriff's Office
 Lincoln County Sheriff's Office
 Mason County Sheriff's Office
 Okanogan County Sheriff's Office
 Pacific County Sheriff's Office
 Pend Oreille County Sheriff's Office
 Pierce County Sheriff's Department
 San Juan County Sheriff's Office
 Skagit County Sheriff's Office 
 Skamania County Sheriff's Office 
 Snohomish County Sheriff's Office 
 Spokane County Sheriff's Office
 Stevens County Sheriff's Office
 Thurston County Sheriff's Office
 Wahkiakum County Sheriff's Office
 Walla Walla County Sheriff's Office
 Whatcom County Sheriff's Office
 Whitman County Sheriff's Office
 Yakima County Sheriff's Office

Local agencies 

 Aberdeen Police Department
 Airway Heights Police Department
 Algona Police Department
 Anacortes Police Department
 Arlington Police Department
 Auburn Police Department
 Bainbridge Island Police Department
 Battle Ground Police Department
 Bellevue Police Department
 Bellingham Police Department
 Bingen-White Salmon Police Department
 Black Diamond Police Department
 Blaine Police Department
 Bonney Lake Police Department
 Bothell police Department 
 Bremerton Police Department
 Brewster Police Department
 Brier Police Department
 Buckley Police Department
 Burlington Police Department
 Camas Police Department
 Castle Rock Police Department
 Centralia Police Department
 Chehalis Police Department
 Chelan Police Department
 Cheney Police Department
 Chewelah Police Department
 Cle Elum Roslyn South Cle Elum Police Department
 Clarkston Police Department
 Clyde Hill Police Department
 Colfax Police Department
 College Place Police Department
 Colville Police Department
 Connell Police Department
 Coulee City Police Department
 Coulee Dam Police Department
 Centralia Police Department
 Cosmopolis Police Department
 Coupeville Marshal's Office
 Des Moines Police Department
 DuPont Police Department
 Duvall Police Department
 East Wenatchee Police Department
 Eatonville Police Department
 Edmonds Police Department
 Ellensburg Police Department
 Elma Police Department
 Enumclaw Police Department
 Ephrata Police Department
 Everett Police Department
 Everson Police Department
 Federal Way Police Department
 Ferndale Police Department
 Fife Police Department
 Fircrest Police Department
 Forks Police Department
 Gig Harbor Police Department
 Goldendale Police Department
 Grand Coulee Police Department
 Granite Falls Police Department
 Grandview Police Department
 Granger Police Department
 Hoquiam Police Department
 Issaquah Police Department
 Kalama Police Department
 Kelso Police Department
 Kennewick Police Department
 Kent Police Department
 Kettle Falls Police Department
 Kirkland Police Department
 Kittitas Police Department
 La Center Police Department
 Lake Forest Park Police Department
 Lake Stevens Police Department
 Lacey Police Department
 Langley Police Department
 Liberty Lake Police Department
 Long Beach Police Department
 Longview Police Department
 Lynden Police Department
 Lynnwood Police Department
 Mabton Police Department
 Mattawa Police Department
 Marysville Police Department
 McCleary Police Department
 Medical Lake Police Department
 Medina Police Department
 Mercer Island Police Department
 Mill Creek Police Department
 Milton Police Department
 Monroe Police Department
 Montesano Police Department
 Morton Police Department
 Moses Lake Police Department
 Mossyrock Police Department
 Mount Vernon Police Department
 Mountlake Terrace Police Department
 Moxee Police Department
 Mukilteo Police Department
 Napavine Police Department
 Newcastle Police Department
 Newport Police Department
 Normandy Park Police Department
 North Bonneville Police Department
 Moses Lake Police Department
 Oak Harbor Police Department
 Oakesdale Marshal's Office
 Ocean Shores Police Department
 Odessa Town Marshal's Office
 Olympia Police Department
 Omak Police Department
 Oroville Police Department
 Orting Police Department
 Othello Police Department
 Pacific Police Department
 Palouse Police Department
 Pasco Police Department 
 Port Angeles Police Department
 Port of Seattle Police Department
 Port Orchard Police Department 
 Port Townsend Police Department
 Poulsbo Police Department
 Prosser Police Department
 Pullman Police Department
 Puyallup Police Department
 Quincy Police Department
 Rainier Police Department
 Raymond Police Department
 Redmond Police Department
 Republic Police Department
 Renton Police Department
 Richland Police Department
 Ridgefield Police Department
 Ritzville Police Department
 Roy Police Department
 Royal City Police Department
 Ruston Police Department
 Seattle Police Department
 Selah Police Department
 Sedro-Woolley Police Department
 Sequim Police Department
 Shelton Police Department
 Shoreline Police Department
 Snohomish Police Department
 Snoqualmie Police Department
 Soap Lake Police Department
 South Bend Police Department
 Spokane Police Department 
 Spokane Valley Police Department
 Stanwood Police Department
 Steilacoom Public Safety Department
 Sultan Police Department
 Sumas Police Department
 Sumner Police Department
 Sunnyside Police Department
 Tacoma Police Department
 Tenino Police Department
 Tieton Police Department
 Toledo Police Department
 Tonasket Police Department
 Toppenish Police Department
 Tukwila Police Department
 Tumwater Police Department
 Twisp Police Department
 Union Gap Police Department
 Uniontown Police Department
 Vancouver Police Department
 Walla Walla Police Department
 Wapato Police Department
 Warden Police Department
 Washougal Police Department
 Wenatchee Police Department
 West Richland Police Department
 Westport Police Department
 Wilbur Police Department
 Winlock Police Department
 Winthrop Marshal’s Office
 Woodland Police Department
 Yakima Police Department
 Yelm Police Department
 Zillah Police Department

College and university agencies

 Central Washington University Public Safety and Police Services
 Eastern Washington University Police
 Evergreen State College Police
 University of Washington Police Department
 Washington State University Police
 Western Washington University Police

Tribal agencies 

 Chehalis Tribal Police
 Colville Tribal Police
 Cowlitz Tribal Police
 Lower Elwha Tribal Police
 Hoh Tribal Police
 Kalispel Tribal Police
 Lummi Tribal Police
 Nisqually Tribal Police
 Nooksack Police Department
 Port Gamble Sk'lallam Tribal Police
 Puyallup Tribal Police
 Quileute Tribal Police
 Quinault Tribal Police
 Sauk-Suiattle Tribal Police
 Shoalwater Bay Tribal Police
 Skokomish Tribal Police
 Spokane Tribal Police
 Squaxin Island Tribal Police
 Stillaguamish Police Department
 Suquamish Tribal Police
 Swinomish Tribal Police
 Tulalip Tribal Police
 Upper Skagit Tribal Police
 Yakama Tribal Police

External links
Washington State Law Enforcement Agency (LEA) Codes

References

Washington
Law enforcement agencies of Washington (state)
Law enforcement agencies